The 1991-92 Iran 2nd Division football season was played in one groups of ten teams each. The top two teams – Bargh Shiraz, Shahrdari Sari – gained promotion to the Azadegan League.

Standings

References 
 Iran - List of Second Level Champions

League 2 (Iran) seasons
Iran
2